Karel De Baere (5 February 1925 – 9 October 1985) was a Belgian professional racing cyclist. He won the Omloop Het Nieuwsblad in 1954.

References

External links
 
 

1925 births
1985 deaths
Belgian male cyclists
Sportspeople from Sint-Niklaas
Cyclists from East Flanders